Kévin Tillie (born 2 November 1990) is a French professional volleyball player. He is part of the French national team, which was the 2020 Olympic Champion, 2015 European Champion, and the 2015 World League winner. At the professional club level, he plays for Projekt Warsaw.

Personal life
Tillie was born in Cagnes-sur-Mer, France. He is from an athletic family—his father Laurent was the head coach of the France men's national volleyball team during years, his mother Caroline played at the professional and Olympic levels (as did Laurent), his older brother Kim played college basketball with the Utah Utes and now does professionally in Europe and with France, and his younger brother Killian played on a two-way contract with the NBA's Memphis Grizzlies and its G League affiliate, the Memphis Hustle.

In July 2017, he married Anna Diakiewicz. On 3 January 2020, they welcomed their first daughter, Olivia.

Career
After many appearances with the junior and youth national teams, Tillie debuted for the senior French national team at the 2012 FIVB Volleyball World League, where the French team finished in seventh place.

In Tillie's collegiate career, he started his career at Thompson Rivers University in Canada for two years while getting his papers processed to move to the United States. He made the All-Canadian Team honors averaging 4.41 kills per set.

After getting his paperwork done, Tillie transferred to the University of California, Irvine Anteaters for the 2012 and 2013 seasons. Tillie was instrumental to UC Irvine as they made back to back NCAA championship runs those two years. Tillie earned AVCA All-American honors for both years.

In 2015, moved to Polish club ZAKSA Kędzierzyn-Koźle. On October 18, 2015, French national team, including him, achieved title of the European Champion 2015 (3–0 with Slovenia in the finale).

On April 26, 2016, he won with ZAKSA Kędzierzyn-Koźle a title of 2016 Polish Champion. In May 2016, he extended his contract till 2017. In May 2017, Tillie signed a contract with another Polish club Jastrzębski Węgiel and he wanted to continue his career in PlusLiga. In early August 2017, Kevin Tillie informed Jastrzębski Węgiel about his plans to moving to Chinese league despite the currently signed contract with them. The club did not want to cancel their agreement and applied to FIVB on blocking unprofessional situations when a player wants to void already signed contract without previous fulfillment.

Honours

Clubs
 CEV Cup
  2021/2022 – with Tours VB

 National championships
 2014/2015  Turkish Championship, with Arkas İzmir
 2015/2016  Polish Championship, with ZAKSA Kędzierzyn-Koźle
 2016/2017  Polish Cup, with ZAKSA Kędzierzyn-Koźle
 2016/2017  Polish Championship, with ZAKSA Kędzierzyn-Koźle

College
 National championships
 2012  NCAA national championship, with UC Irvine Anteaters
 2013  NCAA national championship, with UC Irvine Anteaters

Youth national team
 2008  CEV U20 European Championship

Individual awards
 2017: Polish Cup – Best Receiver

State awards
 2021:  Knight of the Legion of Honour

References

External links

 
 
 
 Player profile at LegaVolley.it 
 Player profile at PlusLiga.pl 
 Player profile at Volleybox.net 

1990 births
Living people
People from Cagnes-sur-Mer
Sportspeople from Alpes-Maritimes
French men's volleyball players
Olympic volleyball players of France
Volleyball players at the 2016 Summer Olympics
Volleyball players at the 2020 Summer Olympics
Medalists at the 2020 Summer Olympics
Olympic gold medalists for France
Olympic medalists in volleyball
French expatriate sportspeople in Canada
French expatriate sportspeople in the United States
Expatriate volleyball players in the United States
French expatriate sportspeople in Italy
Expatriate volleyball players in Italy
French expatriate sportspeople in Turkey
Expatriate volleyball players in Turkey
French expatriate sportspeople in Poland
Expatriate volleyball players in Poland
French expatriate sportspeople in China
Expatriate volleyball players in China
UC Irvine Anteaters men's volleyball players
ZAKSA Kędzierzyn-Koźle players
Projekt Warsaw players
Outside hitters